Abraham Alechenwu (born 26 March 1986) is a Nigerian former football player and a football agent.

He spent the majority of his career in Albania where he notably had a successful spell with Elbasani and Tirana and was once dubbed as the best left-back in the Albanian Superliga.

Career

Early career
Abraham started his playing career in Nigeria Division 1 with Ambassadors of Christ as a teenager. He then moved to Albania in 2004 in search of European football. Abraham had three unsuccessful trials at Besa Kavaje, Teuta Durrës and Elbasani, which then forced him to move to Gramozi Ersekë. After playing well for KS Gramozi Erseke the young Nigerian transferred to Apolonia Fier who were playing in Albanian First Division at the time.

Albanian Superliga 
Following a very successful first year in Albanian and European football, Abraham made his move to the Albanian Superliga. His first team in Albania's premiere division was KF Elbasani, he joined them in the summer of 2005. During his first season in the Superliga he was part of a very successful KF Elbasani side that won the league. Abraham was part of the best defence in Albania in that season conceding only 22 goals all season.
He was also part of the Dinamo Tirana team that won the 2007–08 Albanian Superliga. KF Tirana signed the Nigerian defender in the summer transfer window of 2008 for a fee believed to be in the region of around $160,000. He has also set a new record in Albania, having won 4 Albanian Superliga titles, the most ever for a foreign player in Albanian football.

AC Milan friendly 
Abraham played a big role in KF Tirana's 2–1 victory over Italian giants, AC Milan in the first ever Taçi Oil Cup organised by Albanian oil baron Rezart Taçi. He had a very impressive game at left back, especially going forward. However, despite having a great game he lost the ball just before the end of the game which then lead to Ronaldinho's late goal.
"I felt bad that they were able to score through my mistake. All the same, it was good that we beat Milan, although it was only a friendly match. The bigger joy for me was that I eventually exchanged jerseys with Clarence Seedorf and I was able to get a DVD copy of the match
"

Iraklis Thessaloniki
In July 2010 Abraham signed for Iraklis Thessaloniki F.C. in the Greek Super League.

Vardar Skopje
In June 2012, Abraham signed a one-and-a-half contract with Vardar in the Macedonian First Football League. He played with the team in their away match against BATE Borisov in the 2012–13 UEFA Champions League qualifiers however, he was released before the start of domestic season in Macedonia, and, with the transfer window still open, Abraham ended up returning to Albania where he joined Besa Kavajë.

Adriatiku Mamurrasi
Following Kastrioti Krujë's relegation from the Albanian Superliga, Alechenwu left the club in search of a new team, and he ended up joining Adriatiku Mamurrasi in the Albanian First Division who had serious ambitions regarding achieving promotion to the top flight for the first time in its history.

Laçi
In August 2016, Abraham returned to top flight and signed a one-year contract with Laçi.

Personal life
Abraham has an Albanian passport and can speak Albanian fluently.

Honours
Elbasani
Albanian Superliga: 2005–06

Dinamo Tirana
Albanian Superliga: 2007–08

Tirana
Albanian Superliga: 2006–07, 2008–09
Albanian Supercup: 2006, 2009

References

External links

1986 births
Living people
Nigerian footballers
Association football defenders
KS Gramozi Ersekë players
KF Apolonia Fier players
KF Elbasani players
KF Tirana players
FK Dinamo Tirana players
Besa Kavajë players
Iraklis Thessaloniki F.C. players
FK Vardar players
Nigerian expatriate footballers
Expatriate footballers in Albania
Nigerian expatriate sportspeople in Albania
Expatriate footballers in North Macedonia
Nigerian expatriate sportspeople in North Macedonia
Expatriate footballers in Greece
Nigerian expatriate sportspeople in Greece